Armillaria is a genus of fungi commonly known as honey mushrooms. First treated by Elias Magnus Fries in 1821, and later assigned generic rank by Friedrich Staude in 1857, Armillaria is classified in the family Physalacriaceae of the Agaricales, the gilled mushrooms. The majority of species in Armillaria are saprotrophic and live mainly on dead wood, but some are parasites that can cause root and butt rot in over 600 species of woody plants. Some Armillaria species form mycorrhizae with orchids; others, such as A. gallica, A. mellea, and A. tabescens, are bioluminescent.

Armillaria species form fleshy, white-spored mushrooms with a cottony or membranous veil that typically forms a distinct annulus on the stem. The fruit bodies usually occur in autumn in large clusters at the base of the stem or roots. Armillaria species can produce rhizomorphs—rootlike aggregations of hyphae—that can form massive, long-lasting underground networks. The growth of the rhizomorph networks allows for tree-to-tree spread of the fungus even when direct contact between diseased and healthy plants is not possible.

The genus once served as a wastebasket taxon for many agaric mushrooms with a white spore print, gills attached to the stem, and an annulus. Due largely to differing interpretations on the limits of the genus, over 270 species and varieties have been placed in Armillaria or its synonym Armillariella. A comprehensive 1995 study by Tom Volk and Harold Burdsall evaluated all of the epithets that have been used in Armillaria or Armillariella. They determined that about 40 species belong to Armillaria sensu stricto (in the strict sense); the remaining names belong to species that are distributed among 43 other modern fungal genera.

Many species are difficult or impossible to distinguish from each other using observable characteristics; laboratory incompatibility tests are often used on pure cultures to reliably determine species. Because of the difficulties posed by routine species identification, the use of DNA sequencing and phylogenetic approaches has become a standard method to help clarify relationships between species. Species differ in their geographical distribution and ecological position, host specificity, microscopic and macroscopic features, and also in their aggressiveness in colonizing wood hosts. The following list of Armillaria species is based on the taxonomic overviews provided by Volk and Burdsall in 1995, David Pegler in 2000, and reports of new species that have been published since then.

Species
Key to the table of species below

Notes

References

Cited literature

Armillaria
Fungal plant pathogens and diseases